Franco Gasparri (31 October 1948 – 28 March 1999) was an Italian actor.

Born Gianfranco Gasparri in Senigallia, the son of the painter and film poster artist Rodolfo, Gasparri started his career as a child actor, appearing in several peplum films. 
After military service as a paratrooper, in 1970 he became one of the most successful actors in fotoromanzi. In 1975 Gasparri got a large notoriety playing the inspector Mark Terzi in Mark of the Cop, a successful poliziottesco which generated two sequels, Mark Shoots First and Mark Strikes Again, still with Gasparri in the title role. A skilled and experienced rider, due to a near-fatal motorcycle accident he was forced in a wheelchair, giving up his promising career. He died at 50 years old from respiratory failure.

References

External links 
 
 

1948 births
1999 deaths
Italian male film actors
People from Senigallia  
20th-century Italian male actors
Italian male child actors
Deaths from respiratory failure